George Yuill Mackie (19 April 1949 – 3 April 2020) was a Scotland international rugby union player.

Rugby Union career

Amateur career

He first joined an Aberdeen club called 'the Hairies'; before joining an established team Montrose.

He then moved to Highland club in Inverness. He was the only player capped by Scotland while representing Highland for all his caps. Colin Baillie, who coached him at the club, stated:
He was an extraordinary ball player, great with his hands and he could run all day. He was one of the fittest boys I worked with. He led by example and was always there. On the pitch he would do any task and off the field he was the same. He did what some might have regarded as mediocre jobs, working as a janitor or in a distillery and he never took defeat easily.

Provincial career

Mackie played for North and Midlands.

International career

He played for Scotland 'B' against France 'B' in 1974.

Mackie played for the Scotland national rugby union team between 1975 and 1978 and took part in the 1975 Scotland rugby union tour of New Zealand.

Political career

Outside rugby Mackie was a local councillor for Nazeing in Essex, England. He ran for the Bumble's Green ward in Nazeing in 1987 as a Labour councillor.

Farming career

He had a 500 acre farm in Nazeing inherited from his father. He sold Christmas trees when in season and logs the rest of the year.

Family

His father, John Mackie, was a Labour MP who went into the House of Lords. and who bought the farm in Essex while MP for Enfield East. His uncle, George Mackie, Baron Mackie of Benshie, was Baron Mackie of Benshie, a Liberal Democrat peer. Another uncle was Sir Maitland Mackie.

His wife Catherine was a journalist, a former political editor of the Glasgow Herald; and adviser to Alastair Darling in the Treasury.

He had 2 sons, Robert and Hector. Robert is now in the Treasury, while Hector runs the farm.

Death

Mackie was diagnosed with pancreatic cancer and died from the illness.

References

1949 births
2020 deaths
Scottish rugby union players
Scotland international rugby union players
Highland RFC players
North and Midlands players
Scotland 'B' international rugby union players
Sons of life peers
Rugby union players from Aberdeen
Rugby union number eights